St Marys is a suburb in western Sydney, in the state of New South Wales, Australia. It is 45 kilometres west of the Sydney central business district, in the local government area of the City of Penrith.

St Marys sits between South Creek which forms the western boundary and Ropes Creek, its eastern boundary.

History

The township of St Marys was first known as South Creek. The Bennett coach and wagon works manufactured horse-drawn wagons to meet the growing demand for transport in Sydney. There is a Bennett wagon on display in South Creek Park (on the northern side of the Great Western Hwy, east of South Creek).

The suburb is named after the parish church of St Mary Magdalene, built between 1837 and 1840 and situated between the Great Western Highway and King Street. The church foundation stone was laid on 22 November 1837 by Bishop Broughton. It is one of the oldest churches in New South Wales that still has regular services. The church is heritage-listed. Internees in the church cemetery include the wife of Philip Gidley King, Governor of New South Wales, plus numerous members of the King family. The land was donated by King's son and the bricks were made on his estate. King, Gidley and Lethbridge Streets were named after various members of the King family.

The site is believed to have been chosen by the mother of Phillip Parker King. The property had been acquired from John Oxley in 1828 by King, the original grant having been made in 1823. Other land grants in the area included those to Anna Josepha King in 1807 (Dunheved), Samuel Marsden (Mamre), and Mary Putland (Frogmore).
 
The area was first called South Creek because European settlement was originally centred along the banks of the creek. The land grants became working holdings because of the permanent water supply. The rich alluvial soil along the banks of the creek ensured an expanding agricultural community and its location on what was then called the Great Western Road, later renamed to the Great Western Highway, meant that it became a convenient staging post.

The name St Marys was first used when the St Mary's Post Office was opened on 1 October 1840. Closer settlement of the area was made possible when in 1842 part of the O’Connell Estate was subdivided. St Marys has a long and rich industrial and agricultural history, including tanneries and munitions formerly operated by Australian Defence Industries.

Mamre, situated on Mamre Road, was built c.1830 for Samuel Marsden. It is a two-storey Georgian home that is heritage-listed.

Circa 1829–32, the Lethbridge family built Werrington House just north of St Marys. It was based on the family home in Cornwall. It is one of the most significant colonial homes in New South Wales and is heritage-listed.

St Marys is now the home of the South Creek Vietnam Vets Association and the St Marys & District Historical Society Inc.

Municipality of St Marys
The Municipality of St Marys was proclaimed on 3 March 1890, and the election of the first council was held in May 1890. The council was amalgamated with the Municipality of Penrith on 1 January 1949. The first Mayor was William Garner, and the last mayor was J J Blair (1948). There is a branch office of the Penrith City Council on Queen Street along with a library. The St Marys & District Historical Society is open to the public on Wednesdays and Saturdays from 10 am to 2 pm in the Community Centre complex located on Mamre Road on the southern side of the Great Western Highway.

Heritage listings 
St Marys has a number of heritage-listed sites, including:
 Great Western Railway: St Marys railway station

Demographics
According to the 2016 census of Population, there were 12,195 people in St Marys.
 Aboriginal and Torres Strait Islander people made up 4.1% of the population.
 The most common ancestries were Australian 20.4%, English 20.0%, Irish 5.8%, Scottish 4.7% and Filipino 4.0%
 60.2% of people were born in Australia. The next most common countries of birth were New Zealand 4.1%, Philippines 3.9%, India 3.2%, England 1.8% and Fiji 1.3%.   
 63.7% of people spoke only English at home. Other languages spoken at home included Tagalog 2.5%, Arabic 2.4%, Samoan 1.8%, Hindi 1.7% and Punjabi 1.3%. 
 The most common responses for religion were Catholic 28.9%, No Religion 19.2% and Anglican 13.3%.

Gallery

Commercial area
The main commercial area of St Marys, is primarily on Queen Street, with some shops along Railway Street, and the Great Western Highway. 
This area includes:

St Marys Village Shopping Centre 
St Marys Village Shopping Centre is located on Charles Hackett Drive. This sub-regional centre includes Woolworths, Target and over 40 specialty stores. The centre provides convenient shopping over a single level with easily accessible ground level parking.

Station Plaza 
Station Plaza is a shopping centre which used to include a Coles Supermarket and around 16 speciality stores. It is located on Phillip Street opposite the St Marys train station and bus depot.

Hotels
St Marys Hotel is located on Queen Street. The hotel opened in 1955 and was originally the St Marys Rex Hotel.

Transport

The M4 Motorway sits along the southern boundary with entrance and exit ramps to Mamre Road leading to St Marys Town Centre (North) and the St Clair estate (South). The Great Western Highway is the major East–west road in the suburb. Sydney Street and Marsden Road are on the northern and southern boundaries.

St Marys is also serviced by a regular passenger rail service along the main western railway line with St Marys station forming a major local public transport hub combining rail, bus and taxi services.

Dunheved is a major industrial, and commercial centre to the north. Between March 1942 and March 1986 Dunheved was served by a branch rail line that left the main western line approximately 200 metres west of St Marys station as part of the Ropes Creek branch line that was constructed to serve the munitions works formerly operated by Australian Defence Industries. While the rail infrastructure was left in place for many years after the closure, other than Dunheved Station platform and Ropes Creek Station (within the Ropes Crossing estate), nothing remains of this branch line beyond Christie Street.

Schools
St Marys Primary School
South St Marys Public School
Kurambee School (Special Ed.)
Our Lady of the Rosary Primary School
 St Marys Senior High School

References

External links
 Penrith Local Suburb Profiles
 St Marys & District Historical Society

 
Suburbs of Sydney